Farnley and Wortley railway station served the districts of Farnley and Wortley in Leeds, England from 1848 to 1952 on the Huddersfield line.

History 
The station opened on 8 October 1848 by the London and North Western Railway. The station's name was changed to Wortley and Farnley on 1 February 1877. It was resited on 1 March 1882 when the viaduct line was opened into Leeds. The original platforms were removed shortly after. The name was reverted to Farnley and Wortley in 1891. The station closed to both passengers and goods traffic on 3 November 1952.

References

External links 

Disused railway stations in Leeds
Railway stations in Great Britain opened in 1848
Railway stations in Great Britain closed in 1952
1848 establishments in England
1952 disestablishments in England